The names Cave Hill and Cavehill refer to a number of places:

Barbados
 Cave Hill can refer to two areas, located on the island-nation of Barbados. For one of the main campuses of the University of the West Indies located at Cave Hill, St. Michael see below.
The Cave Hill are in Barbados can refer to:
Cave Hill, Saint Lucy, Cave Hill, St. Lucy is located within the parish of Saint Lucy
Cave Hill, St. Michael, Cave Hill, St. Michael is located in the parish of Saint Michael.

Northern Ireland
Cave Hill or Cavehill, a basaltic hill overlooking the city of Belfast in Northern Ireland

United States
There are 26 "Cave Hills" in the United States according to the USGS's Geographic Names Information System (GNIS).

Kentucky
 Cave Hill Cemetery and Arboretum in Louisville, Kentucky

Virginia
 Cave Hill, Augusta County, Virginia, near Grottoes, Virginia, site of Grand Caverns
 Cave Hill, Augusta County, Virginia, near Waynesboro, Virginia
 Cave Hill, Page County, Virginia, site of Luray Caverns
 Cave Hill, Wythe County, Virginia, near Speedwell, Virginia